Ice Age: Continental Drift is a 2012 American computer-animated adventure comedy film produced by Blue Sky Studios and distributed by 20th Century Fox. It is the sequel to Ice Age: Dawn of the Dinosaurs (2009) and the fourth installment  in the Ice Age film series. The film was directed by Steve Martino and Michael Thurmeier (in his feature directorial debut). Ray Romano, John Leguizamo, Denis Leary, Seann William Scott, Josh Peck, Queen Latifah, and Chris Wedge reprise their roles from previous films, with Peter Dinklage, Jennifer Lopez, Drake, and Nicki Minaj voicing new characters. The plot focuses on Scrat mistakenly sending Manny, Sid, and Diego adrift on an iceberg with Sid's Granny and causing them to face a gang of pirates led by Captain Gutt on Earth.

The film was released in the United States on July 13, 2012, as the first Ice Age film to be presented in the 2.40:1 aspect ratio. The film received mixed reviews. While the performances, animation, score, charm and humor were praised, it was criticized for its plot and unoriginality. Despite receiving mixed reviews from critics, it grossed $879.7 million worldwide, marking it the fifth highest-grossing film of 2012 and the highest-grossing animated film of 2012. A sequel, Ice Age: Collision Course, was released in 2016.

Plot
Manny and Ellie are living happily with their teenage daughter Peaches. However, while Ellie supports and accepts her daughter’s desire to explore and meet new people, Manny is exceedingly overprotective, irritating Peaches and driving a wedge between the two. Meanwhile, Sid's family returns, but only to drop off the elderly Granny before promptly abandoning them both. Manny then catches Peaches hanging out with a group of teenage mammoths he does not approve of, causing a heated argument between him and Peaches. Shortly after, a sudden continental break-up caused by Scrat trying to bury his acorn traps Manny, Sid, Diego, and Granny on moving chunks of ice, giving them no choice but to ride the current and separating them from Ellie, Peaches, and the rest of the animals, who remain on land, causing Peaches to feel guilty over her fight with her father. At the same time, a giant land shift encroaches on those remaining on land, forcing them to make their way towards a land bridge in order to get to safety under Ellie's lead. Meanwhile, Scrat finds another acorn at the bottom of the ocean, but a broken one that, inside, shows a map to "The Lost City Of Scratlantis" which Scrat sets off for.

After encountering a violent hurricane which pushes them further away from land, Manny's group is captured by a band of pirates sailing on a floating iceberg pirate ship led by a Gigantopithecus, Captain Gutt, who attempts to pressure them into joining his crew. When Manny refuses, Gutt tries to execute them; this leads to their escape, which inadvertently causes the ship and food supplies to sink. Gutt's first mate, a sabretooth named Shira, is forced to join them after she is rescued after being left for dead by her crew mates.

The herd washes ashore on Switchback Cove, which gives a current back to their home. After learning that Gutt has enslaved a group of hyrax and is using them to build a new iceberg ship, Manny coordinates a plan with some more hyrax to free their comrades and steal the ship, and they are able to create a diversion. Just before they manage to escape aboard the ship, Diego, having fallen in love with Shira, tries to convince her to leave the pirates and join the herd for a better life, but Shira, starting to reciprocate Diego's feelings, while initially accepting, instead stays behind and slows Gutt down so the herd can escape. Gutt forms yet another ship and plots revenge on Manny.

Meanwhile, during the animals' trek to the land bridge back on the mainland, Peaches joins the group of mammoths from before, only to find out that they do not care about the ongoing danger and they look down on her for being friends with a mole hog named Louis. When Louis overhears Peaches telling the other mammoths that they are not actually friends, Peaches realises who her true friends are, berates the others for their cocky attitudes, and storms off.

After narrowly escaping a pack of sirens, Manny, Sid, Diego, and Granny return home and find that not only has the land bridge been destroyed, but Gutt has beaten them and taken Ellie, Peaches, and the rest of the herd hostage. Louis faces Gutt to save Peaches, ignoring what she said about them earlier, ensuing a fight, as Granny's pet whale, Precious, arrives and fends off Gutt's crew. Peaches saves Ellie, while Manny defeats Gutt in a final duel on an ice floe before he is saved by Precious from falling into the ocean. Gutt subsequently encounters a siren that assumes the shape of a female Gigantopithecus, who eats him alive by trapping him in a giant clam. In the aftermath, Peaches reconciles with both Louis and Manny, who is finally reunited with his family and friends, while Shira joins the herd and starts a romance with Diego. With their home destroyed by the land shift, Precious takes the herd to a lush island, where the hyraxes from earlier have already started rebuilding their civilization.

In the epilogue, Scrat reaches Scratlantis, where Ariscratle welcomes him. When Scrat sees acorns everywhere, he is overpowered by them and is eagerly hyperactive. When Ariscratle warns him not to take any more, Scrat unsuccessfully attempts resistance, but then pulls a giant acorn plug where water comes in and flushes the entire city down, taking Ariscratle and the other residents with it in the process. Scrat survives, but when trying to dig where the city is now, the ground cracks as Scrat is now in the middle of a dry desert known as the Death Valley, where his eyes start burning.

Voice cast

Production
The first details of the sequel were announced on January 10, 2010, when The New York Times reported that Blue Sky was working on a fourth film and was in negotiations with the voice cast. Fox later confirmed on May 5, 2010, that Ice Age: Continental Drift would be released on July 13, 2012.

Music
A soundtrack album of music by John Powell was released on July 10, 2012 by Varèse Sarabande. In addition to Powell's original score, the film also features Beethoven's 9th Symphony. Powell explained his decision: "At the beginning of the film, the creation of the geographical world as we know it seemed just such an immense idea to musically convey, that I gave up entirely and used Beethoven's Ninth Symphony instead. With a bit of obscenely crass re-orchestration and blatantly cheap arranging tricks normally associated with strippers, we got it to fit the action perfectly. But the cost that I must now bear is having to live forever in hiding, since the "Beethoven Society" issued a "fatwa" on me."

Featured in the film was "Chasing the Sun", performed by The Wanted the film's first theme song, and the second theme song "We are (Family)" written by Ester Dean, performed by Keke Palmer. Both songs play during the credits and are not available on the soundtrack. "Chasing The Sun" can be found on The Wanted's 2012 American debut extended play, The Wanted EP, while an alternate version of "We Are (Family)" sung only by Keke Palmer is available for download.

Captain Gutt’s pirates also perform a sea shanty during the film.

Release
Ice Age: Continental Drift had its premiere on June 20, 2012, at the CineEurope film distributors' trade fair in Barcelona. It publicly premiered on June 27, 2012, in Belgium, Egypt, France, Switzerland, and Trinidad, and was released on July 13, 2012, in the USA. The film was accompanied by the short animated film The Longest Daycare, featuring Maggie Simpson from the animated sitcom The Simpsons.

Marketing
As a promotion for Ice Age: Continental Drift, Fox released two 3-minute short segments from the film, titled Scrat's Continental Crack-up and Scrat's Continental Crack-up: Part 2. The first part premiered as a theatrical release attached to Gulliver's Travels in 2010, and later with Rio. It was also released online on January 6, 2011, on iTunes Movie Trailers. The second part was released on November 16, 2011, on iTunes, and debuted in theatres with Alvin and the Chipmunks: Chipwrecked. The first part shows how Scrat's actions lead to split of the continents, while in the second part, Scrat's underwater pursuit of acorns leads him to a pirate ship.

The film was featured on Tommy Baldwin Racing's No. 10 car driven by Tomy Drissi for the 2012 NASCAR Sprint Cup Series Toyota/Save Mart 350 held on June 24, 2012.

Home media
Ice Age: Continental Drift was released on DVD, Blu-ray, and Blu-ray 3D on December 11, 2012.

Reception

Box office
Ice Age: Continental Drift earned $161.3 million in North America, and $715.9 million in other territories, for a worldwide total of $879.7 million. Its worldwide opening weekend totaled $126.9 million. , worldwide it is the 66th-highest-grossing film of all time, the fifth-highest-grossing film of 2012 (also, the highest-grossing animated film of that year), and the second-highest-grossing film in the Ice Age series. Overall, it is the fifteenth-highest-grossing animated film of all time.

North America
In North America, the film earned $16.7 million on its opening day and $46.6 million on its opening weekend, which was the second-largest opening weekend in the Ice Age series, only behind The Meltdown ($68 million). The film closed from theaters on February 7, 2013 with $161 million, thus standing as the lowest-grossing film in the series, until Ice Age: Collision Course would gross less than $100 million in 2016.

Other territories
Outside North America, it is the twelfth-highest-grossing film, the third-highest-grossing 2012 film and the second-highest-grossing film distributed by Fox. It set an all-time record among animated films, until Disney's Frozen surpassed it. Ice Age 4 had a two-day (Wednesday–Thursday) opening of $11 million from 12 markets. On its opening weekend (through Sunday), it earned first place with $80.3 million from 34 markets, opening No. 1 in all of them. The film set an opening-day record in Nicaragua and a Thursday-opening record in Guatemala. In Peru, it earned the second-highest-grossing opening day and the highest for an animated film. It also set opening-day records for an animated film in Russia and in Sweden and achieved the second-highest-grossing opening day for an animated film in France ($4.5 million), Colombia, Argentina, and Chile. The film set opening-weekend records for any film in Argentina (first surpassed by Iron Man 3), Colombia, Peru, Central America, and Chile, and opening-weekend records for an animated film in Norway, Sweden (surpassed by Frozen), Ecuador, and Bolivia. Its largest opening weekends were recorded in Russia and the CIS ($16.9 million), China ($15.7 million), and France and the Maghreb region ($12.8 million). It is the second-highest-grossing film in Latin America with at least $181 million, only behind Marvel's The Avengers.

Critical response
The site's critical consensus reads, "Ice Age: Continental Drift 3D has moments of charm and witty slapstick, but it often seems content to recycle ideas from the previous films." On Metacritic, the film has a score of 49 out of 100 based on 29 critics, indicating "mixed or average reviews". Audiences polled by CinemaScore gave the film an average grade of "A−" on an A+ to F scale.

Roger Ebert of the Chicago Sun-Times gave the film two stars out of four and stated, "Watching this film was a cheerless exercise for me. The characters are manic and idiotic, the dialogue is rat-a-tat chatter, the action is entirely at the service of the 3D, and the movie depends on bright colors, lots of noise and a few songs in between the whiplash moments." Megan Lehmann of The Hollywood Reporter said, "It's familiar, drawn-out shtick, and the humor lacks the subtlety of the first and best Ice Age, but there are some visually inventive high points."

Simon Brew, writing for Den of Geek, gave a very positive four-star review, saying that "not only is Ice Age 4 arguably the best in the franchise yet, it's also, a little surprisingly perhaps (given that it's a fourth movie in a franchise, turned around on a strict cycle), turned out to be thoroughly, thoroughly entertaining family blockbuster." Olly Richards of Empire Magazine, gave the film three out of five stars and wrote, "Old friends and new voice talent will delight kids with a never-ending love for the most undemanding animation out there. A megabucks franchise drifts on."

Video game

Ice Age: Continental Drift – Arctic Games, a tie-in video game based on the film developed by Behaviour Interactive and published by Activision, was released on July 10, 2012 for Wii, Nintendo 3DS, Nintendo DS, PlayStation 3, and Xbox 360.

Sequel

A sequel, titled Ice Age: Collision Course, was released on July 22, 2016.

See also

 List of animated feature-length films
 List of computer-animated films

References

External links

 
 
 

2012 films
2012 3D films
3D animated films
2012 animated films
2012 computer-animated films
2010s American animated films
2012 fantasy films
American 3D films
American computer-animated films
American sequel films
Animated films about cats
Animated films about squirrels
Atlantis in fiction
Films scored by John Powell
Films directed by Steve Martino
Films produced by Lori Forte
Films with screenplays by Michael Berg
Continental Drift
Pirate films
Seafaring films
Blue Sky Studios films
20th Century Fox films
20th Century Fox animated films
20th Century Fox Animation films
Films directed by Mike Thurmeier
2010s English-language films